Dalal Midhat-Talakić (née Midhat; born 5 August 1981) is a Bosnian singer. She is a member of the Bosnian R&B duo Erato.

She represented Bosnia and Herzegovina in the Eurovision Song Contest 2016 with Deen, Ana Rucner and Jala Brat. Together they performed the song "Ljubav je" on 10 May 2016 during the first semi-final of the competition, but failed to qualify to the 14 May final.

References 

1981 births
Living people
21st-century Bosnia and Herzegovina women singers
Eurovision Song Contest entrants for Bosnia and Herzegovina
Singers from Sarajevo
Eurovision Song Contest entrants of 2016
Bosnia and Herzegovina pop singers